Dionysius of Syracuse may refer to:
Dionysius I of Syracuse, tyrant of Syracuse from 405 BC to 367 BC.; father of Dionysius II
Dionysius II of Syracuse, tyrant of Syracuse from 367 BC to 357 BC and again from 346 BC to 344 BC.; son of Dionysius I